The 2019 Washington Valor season was the third season for the Washington Valor in the Arena Football League. The Valor played at the Capital One Arena and were coached by Benji McDowell for the 2019 season.

Standings

Schedule

Regular season
The 2019 regular season schedule was released on February 13, 2019. All times Eastern.

Postseason

Game summaries

References

Washington Valor
Washington Valor seasons
21st century in Washington, D.C.
Washington Valor season